Lima is the capital of Peru.

Lima may also refer to:

Places

Argentina
Lima, Buenos Aires, in Zárate Partido

Honduras
La Lima, in Cortés department, Honduras

Italy
Lima (river), a tributary of the Serchio in Tuscany

Iran
Lima, Iran, in Gilan Province
Lima Chal, in Gilan Province
Lima Gavabar, in Gilan Province

Paraguay
Lima District, Paraguay

Peru
Lima Region, a political region of Peru
Lima Province, a province of Peru
Lima District, the downtown district of Lima, Peru

Portugal
Lima, a designated wine region in the Vinho Verde region

Sweden
Lima, Sweden

United States
Lima, Illinois
Lima, Indiana, the original name of Howe, Indiana
Lima Township, Michigan
Lima Center, Michigan, an unincorporated community
Lima, Montana
Lima (town), New York
Lima (village), New York
Lima, Ohio, the largest US city named Lima
North Lima, Ohio
Lima, Pennsylvania
Lima, Wisconsin (disambiguation), multiple places
West Lima, Wisconsin
Lima, Oklahoma

Facilities and structures
Lima (Buenos Aires Metro), a metro station
Lima Stadium, listed on the National Register of Historic Places
Long Island MacArthur Airport, an airport in Long Island, New York, initialized LIMA

Biology
Lima bean, a vegetable
Lima (bivalve), a genus of bivalve molluscs
Left internal mammary artery, often used in coronary artery bypass surgery

Companies and organizations
Lima (models), an Italian brand of model railways
Lima (restaurant), London, UK; a Peruvian cuisine restaurant
Lima Locomotive Works

People and characters
Lima culture, a pre-Incan civilization that existed in modern-day Peru
Lima, a minor Roman goddess of doorways; see indigitamenta
Lima (surname)
Lima (footballer, born 1942), Antônio Lima dos Santos, Brazilian football defender
Lima (footballer, born 1962), Adesvaldo José de Lima, Brazilian football forward
Lima (footballer, born 1981), Aparecido Francisco de Lima, Brazilian football striker
Lima (footballer, born 1982), João Maria Lima do Nascimento, Brazilian football forward
Lima (footballer, born 1983), Rodrigo José Lima dos Santos, Brazilian football striker
Lima (footballer, born 1986), Éverson Alan da Lima, Brazilian football defender
Lima (footballer, born 1999), Guilherme Natan de Lima, Brazilian football midfielder

Other uses
Lima Mudlib, an online game software framework
Lima Syndrome, opposite of Stockholm Syndrome
Langkawi International Maritime and Aerospace Exhibition, initialized LIMA, a biennial showcase event in Malaysia
The letter L in the NATO phonetic alphabet
The number five in Austronesian languages
Lima, the code name for an Athlon 64 CPU core

See also

 Lima and Callao Metropolitan Area
 Lima y Callao